Neumarkt am Wallersee is a town in the district of Salzburg-Umgebung in the state of Salzburg in Austria.

Origins 

The origins of the city are in 1240, with the Archbishop Erberhard II of Salzburg.

Population 

Neumarkt am Wallersee has a population of 5,651 inhabitants.

Politics 
The city council has 25 members:

 11 ÖVP 
 8 SPÖ 
 3 Grüne 
 3 FPÖ

Mayor is Emmerich Karl Riesner (ÖVP).

Equipments 

 Höhere Bundeslehranstalt für wirtschaftliche Berufe 
 Handelsakademie 
 Handelsschule 
 Fachschule 
 Polytechnische Schule 
 Hauptschule 
 Volksschulen

History 

During the Napoleonic Wars, in December 1800, Neumarkt am Wallersee was the scene of a military action between the Austrian Army, fleeing after its major defeat in the Battle of Hohenlinden, and the pursuing French Army. The Austrians fared badly in this as in other engagements of this campaign.

See also 
 Salzburg
 Salzburgerland

References

External links

Cities and towns in Salzburg-Umgebung District